The Japanese national under-17 basketball team represents Japan in international basketball competitions. It is administered by the Japan Basketball Association. It represents the country in international under-17 and under-16 (under age 17 and under age 16) basketball competitions.

A prominent member had been Rui Hachimura.

World Cup record

Head coaches
  Takashi Ideguchi – 2013–2014
  Torsten Loibl – 2015–present

See also
Japan national basketball team
Japan national under-19 basketball team
Japan women's national under-17 basketball team

References

External links

Men's national under-17 basketball teams
Basketball